Jake Paul vs. Tyron Woodley II, billed as "Leave No Doubt", was a professional boxing rematch contested between YouTuber Jake Paul and mixed martial artist Tyron Woodley. The bout took place on December 18, 2021, at the Amalie Arena in Tampa, Florida.

Background 

It was announced on October 29, 2021 that undefeated duo Jake Paul and Tommy Fury would be facing each other on December 18, less than four months after Fury had made his U.S. debut on the undercard of Paul's bout against mixed martial artist and former UFC Welterweight Champion Tyron Woodley on August 29. The bout was slated to be contested at a limit of 192 lbs under the cruiserweight division and aired live on Showtime PPV in the United States similarly to Paul-Woodley.

On November 5, 2021, a few details of the undercard were announced, as Paul teammate and former Tommy Fury opponent Anthony Taylor was announced to be taking on Nate Diaz's teammate Chris Avila in a fight at 168-pounds for eight rounds. Also announced for the undercard was former NBA player Deron Williams in a fight against former NFL player Frank Gore.

On December 6, 2021, Fury pulled out of the bout due to a bacterial chest infection and a broken rib, and was replaced by Tyron Woodley, who faced Paul in a rematch after losing a split decision to him back in August. The rematch was contested over eight rounds at a limit of 192 lbs under the cruiserweight division. On December 18, 2021, Jake Paul won the rematch by KO, 2 minutes and 12 seconds into the 6th round.

Fight card

Broadcasting

References

External links 

Boxing matches
2021 in boxing
2021 in sports in Florida
December 2021 sports events in the United States
Boxing in Florida
Boxing on Showtime
Events in Tampa, Florida
Pay-per-view boxing matches
Crossover boxing events